In geometry, the Whitney umbrella (or Whitney's umbrella, named after American mathematician Hassler Whitney, and sometimes called a Cayley umbrella) is a specific self-intersecting ruled surface placed in three dimensions.  It is the union of all straight lines that pass through points of a fixed parabola and are perpendicular to a fixed straight line which is parallel to the axis of the parabola and lies on its perpendicular bisecting plane.

Formulas
Whitney's umbrella can be given by the parametric equations in Cartesian coordinates
 
where the parameters u and v range over the real numbers.  It is also given by the implicit equation
 
This formula also includes the negative z axis (which is called the handle of the umbrella).

Properties

Whitney's umbrella is a ruled surface and a right conoid. It is important in the field of singularity theory, as a simple local model of a pinch point singularity. The pinch point and the fold singularity are the only stable local singularities of maps from R2 to R3.

It is named after the American mathematician Hassler Whitney.

In string theory, a Whitney brane is a D7-brane wrapping a variety whose singularities are locally modeled by the Whitney umbrella. Whitney branes appear naturally when taking Sen's weak coupling limit of F-theory.

See also 
 Cross-cap
 Right conoid
 Ruled surface

References 
  (Images and movies of the Whitney umbrella.)

Differential topology
Singularity theory
Surfaces
Algebraic geometry